Berkeley to Bakersfield is Cracker's ninth studio album, released on December 9, 2014 on 429 Records. The release is a double album and was the band's first studio album in five years. The Berkeley album is influenced by punk and garage, while the Bakersfield album leans toward the band's "California country" side.

Part of the album was recorded with the lineup of Cracker's heyday. Bassist Davey Faragher and drummer Michael Urbano were members of the band when its most successful album Kerosene Hat was recorded.

Lead single "Waited My Whole Life" was released to radio in October 2014.

Track listing

References

2014 albums
Cracker (band) albums
429 Records albums